A letterhack is a fan who is regularly published in magazine and American comic book letter columns.

Origin
The term comes from fanspeak, the slang of science fiction fans, and originally referred to prolific writers of letters to fanzines and professional science fiction magazines of the early twentieth century.  It was considered to be an important part of fanac ("fan activity").

Celebrity and recognition
Many letterhacks became well known throughout the industry. Writer Mark Engblom describes the phenomenon this way:

 Jerry Bails — the "father of comics fandom"
 Reed Beebe — over 300 letters published since 2010
 Olav Beemer — became one of the most prolific Dutch comic book translators
 Len Biehl
 Malcolm Bourne
 Brian Earl Brown
 Dale L. Coe
 Augie De Blieck Jr. — claims to have published over 400 letters (184 confirmed through Grand Comics Database)
 Brett Downard
 Joe Frank
 Paul Gambaccini
 Shirley A. Gorman
 Elizabeth Holden
 Paul Dale Roberts — published over 1,000 letters
 Jana C. Hollingsworth
 Kashif "Blue Panther" Husain

 Guy H. Lillian III  — omnipresent 1960s letterhack
 Marc Lucas
 T.M. Maple (aka Jim Burke) — published over 3,000 letters
Joey Marchese
 Rich Morrissey
 "Uncle Elvis" Orten
 Melissa Page 
 Kent A. Phenis
 Peter Sanderson
 Bill Schelly — comic book historian
 Al Schroeder III
 Charles J. Sperling
 Irene Vartanoff— omnipresent 1960s letterhack who ended up working behind the scenes for Marvel in the 1970s and 1980s 
 Delmo Walters, Jr.

David S. Goyer is an example of a fan who later wrote comic book films. Some letterhacks gained entrée into an actual career in comics because of their letter-writing experience. For instance, Bob Rozakis parlayed his frequent published letters to DC comics during the late 1960s and early 1970s into a job as DC's "Answer Man" and eventually a solid career as a DC writer. Kurt Busiek, Mary Jo Duffy, Mike Friedrich, Mark Gruenwald, Fred Hembeck, Harlan Ellison, Tony Isabella, Paul Levitz, Ralph Macchio, Dean Mullaney, Martin Pasko, Diana Schutz, Beau Smith, Roy Thomas, Peter B. Gillis, George R.R. Martin, and Kim Thompson are just a few of the many comic book professionals who got their starts as young letterhacks.

See also 

 Comic book letter column
 Fan mail
 Letter to the editor

References 

Comics people
Fan labor
Fanspeak